eroFame is a trade convention for the erotic market.  Today, eroFame is worldwide the leading B2B event for the erotic industry, attracting over 200 national and international exhibitors in its latest instalment. The international trade convention has a focus on products and services from the erotic market and the lifestyle segment, including adult toys and erotic accessories, but also lingerie and other products that only have little to do with the hardcore industry.

Since 2010, eroFame has also been the platform for the presentation of the annual EROTIX AWARDs.

History

eroFame took place for the first time at the Metropolishalle of Filmpark Babelsberg in Potsdam near Berlin, in October 2010. Due to the increasing number of exhibitors and the growing interest among trade members, the b2b trade convention moved to the current location in the Lower-Saxon capital of Hannover the following year. Since 2011, eroFame has been taking place on the Expo fairgrounds in Hanover, the world's largest fairground.

Development and exhibitor numbers

When eroFame premiered in 2010, the organisers welcomed 93 exhibiting companies.
In October 2011, the number of exhibitors on the fairgrounds in Hanover had already swelled to 116. 
2012 165 companies booked a trade show stand.
In 2013 191 exhibitors presented the products to the visitors.
2014 already have more exhibitors booked exhibition stands, as in previous years.

The international exhibition committee

The international exhibition committee consists of the following companies:

 JOYDIVISION international AG, Germany / USA
 Orion Versand GmbH & Co. KG, Germany
  group S.A., Luxembourg
 Scala 2.0 B.V., Netherlands
 Schneider & Tiburtius GmbH, Germany

The trade convention is organised by Mediatainment Publishing eroFame GmbH.

References

External links
 Official website
 List of exhibitors 2011
 List of exhibitors 2012
 List of exhibitors 2013
 Statements of the exhibitors of eroFame 2012

Trade fairs in Germany